Kiryushkino is a rural locality (a selo) in Deniskinsky Selsoviet, Fyodorovsky District, Bashkortostan, Russia. The population was 358 as of 2010. There are 5 streets.

Geography 
Kiryushkino is located 29 km south of Fyodorovka (the district's administrative centre) by road. Novosyolka is the nearest rural locality.

References 

Rural localities in Fyodorovsky District